Benimakia flavida is a species of sea snail, a marine gastropod mollusc in the family Fasciolariidae, the spindle snails, the tulip snails and their allies.

Description

Distribution
This marine species occurs off the Philippines.

References

 Smith, E. A. 1906. On South African marine Mollusca, with descriptions of new species. Annals of the Natal Government Museum 1:19-71, pls. 7–8.
 Marais J.P. & R.N. Kilburn (2010) Fasciolariidae. pp. 106–137, in: Marais A.P. & Seccombe A.D. (eds), Identification guide to the seashells of South Africa. Volume 1. Groenkloof: Centre for Molluscan Studies. 376 pp

External links
 Adams, A. (1855). Description of twenty-seven new species of shells from the collection of Hugh Cuming, Esq. Proceedings of the Zoological Society of London. (1854) 22: 311-317

Fasciolariidae
Gastropods described in 1855